Jos De Haes (Leuven, 22 April 1920-Jette, 1 March 1974) was a Flemish writer and poet.

Bibliography
 Het andere wezen (1942) 
 Pindaros. Pythische oden (1945) 
 Ellende van het woord (1946) 
 Gedaanten (1954) 
 Richard Minne (1956) 
 Reisbrieven uit Griekenland (1957) 
 Sophokles. Philoktetes (1959) 
 Azuren holte (1964)
 Verzamelde gedichten (1974) 
 Verzamelde gedichten (1986) 
 Gedichten (2004)

Awards
 1955 - Arkprijs van het Vrije Woord

References
Jos De Haes
 Jan Kuijper, de tombe van jos de haes In: Tomben (1989) 
 Albert Westerlinck, Het poëtisch wereldbeeld van Jos De Haes (1965)

1920 births
1974 deaths
De Haes, Jos
Ark Prize of the Free Word winners
Belgian writers